See homology for an introduction to the notation.

Persistent homology is a method for computing topological features of a space at  different spatial resolutions. More persistent features are detected over a wide range of spatial scales and are deemed more likely to represent true features of the underlying space rather than artifacts of sampling, noise, or particular choice of parameters.

To find the persistent homology of a space, the space must first be represented as a simplicial complex. A distance function on the underlying space corresponds to a filtration of the simplicial complex, that is a nested sequence of increasing subsets. One common method of doing this is by taking the Offset Filtration on a point cloud and taking its nerve in order to get a simplicial filtration known as the Čech filtration.

Definition 

 
When , the inclusion  induces a homomorphism  on the simplicial homology groups for each dimension . The  persistent homology groups are the images of these homomorphisms, and the  persistent Betti numbers  are the ranks of those groups. Persistent Betti numbers for  coincide with
the size function, a predecessor of persistent homology.

Any filtered complex over a field  can be brought by a linear transformation preserving the filtration to so called canonical form, a canonically defined direct sum of filtered complexes of two types: one-dimensional complexes with trivial differential   and two-dimensional complexes with trivial homology .

Equivalently, we may consider it as a functor from  considered as a category to the category of vector spaces (or -modules). There is a classification of persistence modules over a field  indexed by : 

Multiplication by  corresponds to moving forward one step in the persistence module. Intuitively, the free parts on the right side correspond to the homology generators that appear at filtration level  and never disappear, while the torsion parts correspond to those that appear at filtration level  and last for  steps of the filtration (or equivalently, disappear at filtration level ). 

Each of these two theorems allows us to uniquely represent the persistent homology of a filtered simplicial complex with a barcode or persistence diagram. A barcode represents each persistent generator with a horizontal line beginning at the first filtration level where it appears, and ending at the filtration level where it disappears, while a persistence diagram plots a point for each generator with its x-coordinate the birth time and its y-coordinate the death time.
Equivalently the same data is represented by Barannikov's canonical form, where each generator is represented by a segment connecting the birth and the death values plotted on separate lines for each   
.

Stability 

Persistent homology is stable in a precise sense, which provides robustness against noise. The bottleneck distance is a natural metric on the space of persistence diagrams given by  where  ranges over bijections. A small perturbation in the input filtration leads to a small perturbation of its persistence diagram in the bottleneck distance. For concreteness, consider a filtration on a space  homeomorphic to a simplicial complex determined by the sublevel sets of a continuous tame function . The map  taking  to the persistence diagram of its th homology is 1-Lipschitz with respect to the -metric on functions and the bottleneck distance on persistence diagrams.
That is, .

Computation 

There are various software packages for computing persistence intervals of a finite filtration. The principal algorithm is based on the bringing of the filtered complex to its canonical form by upper-triangular matrices.

See also
 Topological data analysis
 Computational topology

References

Homology theory
Computational topology